Antonius "Toon" Geurts (29 February 1932 – 5 October 2017) was a Dutch sprint canoer. He was most successful in the K-2 1000 m event, in which he finished in seventh, second and fourth place at the 1960, 1964 and 1968 Olympics, respectively.

References
Sports-reference.com profile
Olympische medaillewinnaar Antoon Geurts uit Veldhoven overleden (in Dutch)

1932 births
2017 deaths
Dutch male canoeists
Canoeists at the 1960 Summer Olympics
Canoeists at the 1964 Summer Olympics
Canoeists at the 1968 Summer Olympics
Medalists at the 1964 Summer Olympics
Olympic canoeists of the Netherlands
Olympic medalists in canoeing
Olympic silver medalists for the Netherlands
People from Veldhoven
20th-century Dutch people
21st-century Dutch people